The 2015 Trophée Éric Bompard was the fourth event of six in the 2015–16 ISU Grand Prix of Figure Skating, a senior-level international invitational competition series. It was held at the Meriadeck Ice Rink in Bordeaux on November 13. Medals were awarded in the disciplines of men's singles, ladies' singles, pair skating, and ice dancing. Skaters earned points toward qualifying for the 2015–16 Grand Prix Final.

The competition was cancelled after the first day following the November 2015 Paris attacks. The short programs and short dances had been completed on 13 November, but the free skatings and free dances were to be held on the second day.

On 23 November, the International Skating Union announced that the short program/short dance results would be considered as the final results for world standing/ranking points, prize money, as well as qualifiers for the Grand Prix Final.

Entries

Changes to initial lineup
 On August 14, Kiira Korpi was removed from the roster. On August 21, her replacement was announced as Roberta Rodeghiero. On August 27, it was announced that Korpi had retired.
 On September 15, Chafik Besseghier was added as a host pick.
 On September 23, Brooklee Han, Miriam Ziegler / Severin Kiefer, Sara Hurtado / Adrià Díaz and Alisa Agafanova / Alper Uçar were added to the roster in place of host picks.
 On September 28, Misha Ge was removed from the roster due to visa problems. On October 15, his replacement was announced as Kim Jin-seo.
 On October 16, Sara Hurtado / Adrià Díaz were removed from the roster. It was announced that the couple had split. On October 26, their replacement was announced as Laurence Fournier Beaudry / Nikolaj Sørensen.
 On November 6, Florent Amodio was removed from the roster due to an injury. No replacement was made.
 On November 11, Gabriella Papadakis / Guillaume Cizeron withdrew due to Papadakis not having fully recovered from her concussion. No replacement was made.

Results
Skaters did not compete their free skating/free dance programs, as the second day of competition was cancelled due to the November 2015 Paris attacks. The short programs of all four disciplines finished several hours before the attacks began.

Men

Ladies

Pairs

Ice dancing

References

External links
 2015 Trophée Éric Bompard at the International Skating Union
 Starting orders and result details

Trophée Éric Bompard, 2015
Internationaux de France
Cancelled sports events
Figure
Trophée Éric Bompard
Sport in Bordeaux 
International figure skating competitions hosted by France